Alexander Tarasov (born 24 December 1990) is a Russian professional ice hockey defenceman. He played with UHC Dynamo in the Kontinental Hockey League during the 2010–11 KHL season.

References

External links

1990 births
Living people
Russian ice hockey defencemen
HC Dynamo Moscow players
People from Magnitogorsk
Sportspeople from Chelyabinsk Oblast